There have been 76 players who have scored 100 or more tries in Australian top-level rugby league, i.e. the NRL and its predecessors, the NSWRL, ARL and SL premierships. Players still currently active are listed in bold.

See also

List of National Rugby League players with five tries in a game
List of players with 1,000 NRL points
List of players with 20 NRL field goals
List of players with 100 NRL tries and 500 NRL goals
List of players with 500 NRL goals
List of players who have played 300 NRL games

References

NRL players with 100 NRL tries
Players with 100 NRL tries
 Tries,500